Lissodrillia is a genus of sea snails, marine gastropod mollusks in the family Drilliidae.

This genus was previously considered a synonym of Cerodrillia Bartsch & Rehder, 1939. The only difference is the presence or absence of very fine spiral lirae.

Species
Species within the genus Lissodrillia include:
 Lissodrillia arcas Fallon, 2016
 Lissodrillia cabofrioensis Fallon, 2016
 Lissodrillia ebur (Dall, 1927)
 Lissodrillia fasciata Fallon, 2016
 Lissodrillia lactea Fallon, 2016
 Lissodrillia levis Fallon, 2016
 Lissodrillia robusta Fallon, 2016
 Lissodrillia schroederi (Bartsch & Rehder, 1939)
 Lissodrillia simpsoni (Dall, 1887)
 Lissodrillia turgida Fallon, 2016
 Lissodrillia verrillii (Dall, 1881)
 Lissodrillia vitrea Fallon, 2016

References

 Bartsch, Paul, and Harald A. Rehder. "New turritid mollusks from Florida." Proceedings of the United States National Museum (1939).

External links
 Fallon P.J. (2016). Taxonomic review of tropical western Atlantic shallow water Drilliidae (Mollusca: Gastropoda: Conoidea) including descriptions of 100 new species. Zootaxa. 4090(1): 1-363

 
Gastropod genera